Crooked River National Grassland is a National Grassland located in Jefferson County in the north-central part of the U.S. state of Oregon. It contains two National Wild and Scenic Rivers, the Deschutes River and the Crooked River. The grassland is managed together with the Ochoco National Forest from Forest Service offices in Prineville. There are local ranger district offices located in Madras, its nearest city.

References

Gallery

External links

Grasslands of Oregon
Protected areas of Jefferson County, Oregon
National Grasslands of the United States
Ochoco National Forest